Héctor Augusto González Guzmán (born November 4, 1977) is a Venezuelan football midfielder who current play for ASIL Lysi. He has played 53 times for the Venezuela national team. His nickname is "El Turbo".

Career
Born in Baruta, Gonzalez played for a number of clubs in Venezuela before moving to Argentine in 2002 where he played for Olimpo de Bahía Blanca, Colón de Santa Fe and Quilmes.

He played very well in Deportivo Cuenca and was well known for his powerful shot. In 2006, he was signed to LDU Quito, which is a soccer team in Ecuador. Liga Deportiva Universitaria decided not extend his contract. Between 2007 and 2009 he played for AEK Larnaca in Cyprus.

On May 14, 2009, 32-year-old Venezuelan midfielder González officially signed for Chernomorets Burgas in an undisclosed fee, his contract is a two-year deal. He made his competitive debut for Chernomorets on 21 May 2009 against Minyor Pernik in round of 24 of the A PFG.

He studied in Valencia, Venezuela in the school named U. E. Colegio Cristo Rey on the north side of the city.

International career
Hector has played 55 times for the national team in Venezuela. In those games he has scored 4 goals.

International goals

References

External links
 Official site of Héctor Gonzalez
 
 International career statistics at rsssf

Living people
1977 births
Association football midfielders
Venezuelan footballers
Venezuelan expatriate footballers
Venezuela international footballers
A.C.C.D. Mineros de Guayana players
Carabobo F.C. players
Caracas FC players
Olimpo footballers
Club Atlético Colón footballers
Quilmes Atlético Club footballers
C.D. Cuenca footballers
L.D.U. Quito footballers
AEK Larnaca FC players
PFC Chernomorets Burgas players
Alki Larnaca FC players
Ermis Aradippou FC players
Llaneros de Guanare players
Atlético Venezuela C.F. players
Doxa Katokopias FC players
2001 Copa América players
2007 Copa América players
Expatriate footballers in Argentina
Expatriate footballers in Ecuador
Expatriate footballers in Cyprus
Expatriate footballers in Bulgaria
Venezuelan expatriate sportspeople in Argentina
Venezuelan expatriate sportspeople in Ecuador
Venezuelan expatriate sportspeople in Cyprus
Venezuelan expatriate sportspeople in Bulgaria
First Professional Football League (Bulgaria) players
Cypriot First Division players
Alki Oroklini players
P.O. Xylotymbou players
ASIL Lysi players
People from Miranda (state)